Eliana Yael Johnson (born c. 1984) is an American journalist and Editor-in-Chief of Washington Free Beacon.

Early life and education
Johnson is the daughter of Sally (née Zusman) and Scott W. Johnson, one of the three  Dartmouth lawyers who founded Power Line, an American political blog publication.  She is of Jewish descent. She was raised in the Twin Cities area of Minnesota. In 2006, she graduated with a B.A. in history from Yale University.

Career
Johnson previously worked as a producer at Fox News on Sean Hannity's television program Hannity and as a staff reporter at The New York Sun.

In August 2014, after two years with National Review, she was promoted from media editor to Washington editor replacing Robert Costa, who had left to join The Washington Post in November 2013.

In November 2016, she became National Political Reporter at Politico.

In September 2019, Johnson was named Editor-in-Chief of the Washington Free Beacon, succeeding founding editor Matthew Continetti.

References

External links
 

Living people
21st-century American women writers
National Review people
Yale University alumni
American women journalists
21st-century American journalists
Journalists from Minnesota
1980s births